St Bede's College may refer to:

St Bede's College (Mentone), Australia
St Bede's College (Bentleigh East), Australia
St Bede's Catholic College, Bristol, England
St Bede's College, Manchester, England
St. Bede's College, Shimla, India
St Bede's College, Christchurch, New Zealand